Manuel Javier Vallejo Galván (born 14 February 1997) is a Spanish professional footballer who plays as winger and forward for Real Oviedo, on loan from Girona FC.

Club career

Cádiz
Born in Chiclana de la Frontera, Cádiz, Andalusia, Vallejo finished his formation with Cádiz CF. He made his senior debut with the reserves on 25 January 2015, coming on as a second-half substitute in a 2–1 Tercera División away loss against Atlético Sanluqueño CF.

Vallejo scored his first senior goal on 17 May 2015, netting his team's second in a 3–2 loss at CD Mairena. On 18 October, he scored a hat-trick in a 7–1 home routing of CD Roda, and finished the campaign with a career-best 23 goals.

Vallejo made his first team debut on 13 January 2016, playing the last 30 minutes in a 2–0 away loss against Celta de Vigo, for the season's Copa del Rey. He made his Segunda División debut on 28 October of the following year, replacing Salvi in a 0–0 home draw against Rayo Vallecano.

On 24 July 2018, Vallejo renewed his contract until 2021, and extended it to a further year on 22 August, being definitely promoted to the main squad. He scored his first professional goal on 12 September 2018, netting the winner in a 2–1 away defeat of CD Tenerife, for the season's Copa del Rey.

Vallejo scored his first league goal on 27 October 2018, netting the equalizer in a 2–1 away defeat of CD Lugo. On 20 December, he further extended his contract, signing until 2023.

Valencia
On 7 February 2019, La Liga side Valencia CF reached an agreement with Cádiz to sign Vallejo; the player remained on loan at the Amarillos until June. On 2 September 2019, due to the arrival of Thierry Correia, Vallejo changed his shirt number from 2 to 15. He made his debut in the top tier on 28 September 2019, coming on as a 69th-minute substitute for Maxi Gómez in 1–0 away victory against Athletic Bilbao, and his Champions League debut on 5 November 2019 when he came on as a 59th-minute substitute for Lee Kang-in in a 4–1 home thrashing of French side Lille.

Vallejo scored his first goal in the main category of Spanish football on 21 December 2019, netting a last-minute equalizer in 1–1 away draw against Real Valladolid.

Loan to Alavés
On 31 January 2022, Vallejo was loaned to fellow top tier side Deportivo Alavés for the remainder of the season.

Girona
On 1 September 2022, Vallejo signed a three-year contract with Girona FC also in the top tier.

Loan to Oviedo
On 27 January 2023, Vallejo joined Real Oviedo on loan until the end of the second division season.

Personal life
Vallejo's father, Javi, is also a footballer.

Career statistics

Club

Honours
Spain U21
UEFA European Under-21 Championship: 2019

References

External links

Manu Vallejo at Cadistas1910 

1997 births
Living people
People from Chiclana de la Frontera
Sportspeople from the Province of Cádiz
Spanish footballers
Footballers from Andalusia
Association football wingers
Association football forwards
Spain under-21 international footballers
La Liga players
Segunda División players
Tercera División players
Cádiz CF B players
Cádiz CF players
Valencia CF players
Deportivo Alavés players
Girona FC players
Real Oviedo players